Etna Creek is a rural locality in the Livingstone Shire, Queensland, Australia. In the  Etna Creek had a population of 792 people.

Geography 
South Yaamba is a town in the north-east of locality. The town of South Yaamba is not to be confused with the locality of South Yaamba, which is adjacent and to the west  of the locality of Etna Creek. The locality of South Yaamba is physically separated from the town of South Yaamba and the locality of Etna Creek by the Fitzroy River.

The North Coast railway line enters the locality from the south (Glendale) and exits to the north (The Caves). Etna Creek railway station is an abandoned railway station on the line.

History 
The locality takes its name from the Etna Creek railway station, which was assigned by the Queensland Railways Department on 23 July 1914.

South Yaamba takes its name from the pastoral run name given by pastoralist Peter Fitzallan MacDonald in the 1860s. Yaamba is believed to be an  Aboriginal word meaning main camping ground. 

Etna Creek Provisional School opened on 31 October 1892. On 1 January 1909 it became Etna Creek State School. It closed in 1950.

In the  Etna Creek had a population of 792 people.

References

External links 

 

Shire of Livingstone
Localities in Queensland